is a passenger railway station  located in the town of Iwami, Iwami District, Tottori Prefecture, Japan. It is operated by the West Japan Railway Company (JR West).

Lines
Only local trains stop at this station.

Station layout
The station consists of two ground-level opposed side platforms, connected by a footbridge.  The station is unattended.

Platforms

Adjacent stations

History
Higashihama Station opened on January 1, 1950.  With the privatization of the Japan National Railways (JNR) on April 1, 1987, the station came under the aegis of the West Japan Railway Company.

Passenger statistics
In fiscal 2018, the station was used by an average of 58 passengers daily.

Surrounding area
The north of the station is the Sea of Japan, and the coast near the station is open to the public as Higashihama Beach.

See also
List of railway stations in Japan

References

External links 

 Higashihama Station from JR-Odekake.net 

Railway stations in Tottori Prefecture
Sanin Main Line
Railway stations in Japan opened in 1950
Iwami, Tottori